Carnation Co v Quebec (Agricultural Marketing Board) [1968] S.C.R. 238 is a leading constitutional decision of the Supreme Court of Canada on the federal authority over trade and commerce under section 91(2) of the Constitution Act, 1867. The Court held that incidental overlap of provincial laws into federal trade and commerce matters does not necessarily invalidate the law.

The issue was whether the Quebec Agricultural Marketing Board, a board created by the province, was ultra vires the authority of the province. The Court held that incidental overlap is allowed where the pith and substance of a law in intra vires the province. The Court found that the pith and substance of the Board was related to contractual rights which is valid provincial subject matter.

References

See also
 List of Supreme Court of Canada cases (Richards Court through Fauteux Court)

Canadian federalism case law
Supreme Court of Canada cases
1968 in Canadian case law
Agricultural marketing